The following is a list of a few of the moths of Indonesia. It is estimated that there are approximately 10,000 moth species in Indonesia.

Family Choreutidae
 Brenthia caelicola
 Brenthia salaconia
 Brenthia spintheristis

Family Crambidae

Subfamily Pyraustinae
 Heterocnephes lymphatalis

Subfamily Spilomelinae
 Hodebertia testalis
 Palpita nigricollis
 Rhimphalea ochalis

Family Erebidae

Subfamily Arctiinae
 Asota kinabaluensis
 Baroa siamica
 Eugoa trifascia

Subfamily Calpinae
 Gespanna pectoralis
 Heterospila nigripalpis
 Phyllodes eyndhovii
 Phyllodes staudingeri
 Phyllodes verhuelli
 Rectipalpula billeti
 Rhynchodina molybdota
 Tamba delicata
 Tamba mnionomera
 Tamba ochra
 Throana lasiocera

Subfamily Erebinae
 Ercheia multilinea
 Ophiusa indistincta
 Platyja umbrina
 Pterocyclophora ridleyi
 Tochara olivacea

Family Eupterotidae
 Eupterote kalliesi

Family Geometridae
 Abaciscus costimacula
 Agathia obsoleta
 Amraica solivagaria
 Auzeodes chalybeata
 Bytharia uniformis
 Cassyma chrotadelpha
 Celerena mutata
 Craspedosis melanura
 Chrysocraspeda abhadraca
 Chrysocraspeda convergens
 Chrysocraspeda mitigata
 Chrysocraspeda plumbeofusa
 Cyclophora heydena
 Cyclophora rotundata
 Derxena nivea
 Dilophodes elegans
 Plutodes flavescens
 Hypochrosis cryptopyrrhata
 Hypochrosis pyrrhophaeata
 Hyposidra aquilaria
 Hyposidra infixaria
 Hyposidra violescens
 Iulotrichia decursaria
 Krananda lucidaria
 Omiza lycoraria
 Ophthalmitis basiscripta
 Ophthalmitis cordularioides
 Ophthalmitis viridior
 Ozola liwana
 Ruttellerona lithina
 Sarcinodes reductatus
 Sarcinodes sumatraria
 Zeheba aureatoides

Family Heliodinidae
 Sobareutis conchophanes

Family Limacodidae
 Barisania lampra

Family Noctuidae

Subfamily Hadeninae
 Clethrorasa pilcheri
 Dyrzela plagiata
 Mudaria luteileprosa

Family Nolidae
 Plagerepne torquata
 Risoba becki
 Risoba calainodes
 Risoba diehli
 Risoba diphtheropsis
 Risoba helbaueri
 Risoba hiemischi
 Risoba hollowayi
 Risoba menhoferi
 Risoba rafflesae
 Risoba rothei
 Risoba sticticata
 Risoba wittstadti

Family Notodontidae
 Oxoia smaragdiplena
 Parasinga lichenina
 Syntypistis palladina
 Tarsolepis malayana

Family Pterophoridae
 Xyroptila falciformis

Family Saturniidae
 Cricula trifenestrata

Family Sphingidae
 Angonyx kai
 Macroglossum belis
 Megacorma obliqua

Family Thyrididae
 Epaena complicatalis
 Hypolamrus taphiusalis
 Rhodoneura acaciusalis
 Rhodoneura pudicula

Family Uraniidae
 Stesichora puellaria

Indonesia